Indirect presidential elections were held in Trinidad and Tobago on 15 February 2013.
 
Prime Minister Kamla Persad-Bissessar's People's Partnership-led government nominated Anthony Carmona, a Judge of the International Criminal Court as their candidate. As Carmona was the only candidate nominated on election day, a vote did not take place and he was declared elected unopposed. He was sworn in to office on 18 March 2013 as the 5th President of Trinidad and Tobago.

Electoral method
The President of Trinidad and Tobago is indirectly elected for a 5-year term by an electoral college comprising all 41 members of the House of Representatives and all 31 members of the Senate.

To win the election a candidate must gain a plurality of votes cast, whereby a quorum comprising the Speaker of the House of Representatives, 10 Senators and 12 other member of the House of Representatives must be met for the election to be considered valid. If only one candidate should be nominated to run in the election, he or she shall be considered to have been elected president without the need for a vote to take place.

Candidates

Nominated by the Government
Anthony Carmona, Judge of the International Criminal Court

Results

Results of the election held on 15 February 2013

References

2013 elections in the Caribbean
2013
Election, Presidential
Uncontested elections